Ciudad Bolívar is the capital of Bolívar State, Venezuela.

Ciudad Bolívar may also refer to:

 Ciudad Bolívar, Antioquia, town and municipality in Antioquia Department, Colombia
 Ciudad Bolívar, Bogotá, locality in the Capital District of Bogotá, Colombia
 Club Ciudad de Bolívar, Argentine volleyball club based in San Carlos de Bolívar